Bursa Uludağ University is a public research university in Bursa, Turkey. The research and education conducted by the university have an emphasis on International Relations, Medicine, Engineering, Natural & Social sciences and Arts.

Organization
The university includes 11 faculties, 1 school on the undergraduate level, 12 vocational schools, 1 conservatoire, 3 institutes, 11 research centers and 6 departments that are under Presidency. In the academic year 2017–2018, there were 74,822 students enrolled in the university.

Notes and references

External links
 Official site

Bursa Uludağ University
Education in Bursa
Educational institutions established in 1975
State universities and colleges in Turkey
1975 establishments in Turkey